Pilosocereus glaucochrous is a species of plant in the family Cactaceae. It is endemic to eastern Brazil, in central Bahia state.  Its natural habitat is subtropical or tropical dry forests. It is threatened by habitat loss.

References

glaucochrous
Cacti of South America
Endemic flora of Brazil
Flora of Bahia
Near threatened flora of South America
Taxonomy articles created by Polbot